Södermanland County in Sweden held a county council election on 19 September 2010 across its nine municipalities. This was part of the 2010 Swedish local elections. It was held on the same day as the general and municipal elections.

Results
The number of seats went up to 71, an addition of six. The Social Democrats won the most seats at 27, a drop of two from 2006.

Municipal results
The nine municipalities were divided into four separate constituencies based on geography, in which Eskilstuna was a unitary constituency.

References

Elections in Södermanland County
Södermanland